The 1971 French Grand Prix was a Formula One motor race held at the Circuit Paul Ricard on 4 July 1971. It was race 5 of 11 in both the 1971 World Championship of Drivers and the 1971 International Cup for Formula One Manufacturers. The 55-lap race was won by Tyrrell driver Jackie Stewart after he started from pole position. His teammate François Cevert finished second and Lotus driver Emerson Fittipaldi came in third.

Race report 

This was the first French Grand Prix to be held at the new Circuit Paul Ricard near Marseille. The Tyrrell team had new front bodywork for Jackie Stewart's car, and the Briton gained pole position with this revised car – also helped by extensive tyre testing in the weeks before – from Clay Regazzoni, Jacky Ickx and Graham Hill. Stewart led away from Regazzoni, Pedro Rodríguez and Jean-Pierre Beltoise, whilst Ickx was jostled through the first chicane and dropped back. Stewart streaked ahead, setting fastest lap on lap 2 and pulling out a 10-second lead by lap 7. His only real challenger, Regazzoni, hit a patch of oil and sailed into the guardrail, breaking a wheel on lap 20. On lap 28 Rodríguez dropped out with a faulty coil, leaving the Tyrrells in 1–2 formation, with François Cevert proving his worth on his home ground. Hill dropped out of fifth place with a broken oil pipe, having previously hit the guardrail whilst avoiding Regazzoni.

This left Jo Siffert in third place, holding off Emerson Fittipaldi, who was in pain and heavily bandaged after a road accident. Despite this, the Brazilian took 3rd on lap 39. Siffert retook this briefly, but Fittipaldi held on for the final podium place from the Swiss. Chris Amon took 5th in an unconvincing performance by home team Matra, duelling with Tim Schenken until Schenken ran out of oil 6 laps from the end.

It was a 1–2 success for the Tyrrells on a tricky circuit, the Cosworth DFV engine providing extra power down the very long Mistral straight.

This was to be Pedro Rodríguez's last Formula One race. He was killed a week later while driving a privately entered Ferrari 512 at an Interserie sports car race at the Norisring in Germany.

Classification

Qualifying

Race

Championship standings after the race

Drivers' Championship standings

Constructors' Championship standings

References

French Grand Prix
French Grand Prix
1971 in French motorsport